Rafael Lovera Montiel (born October 17, 1952) is a former professional boxer from Paraguay. Lovera fought for the WBC's vacant world Junior Flyweight title, losing to Luis Estaba. Lovera is from Fernando de la Mora, Paraguay but he resides in Lambaré.

Boxing career
Lovera has the distinction of having fought for a world title in his only professional boxing match. Midway through 1975, the WBC desired its world Junior Flyweight champion, Italy's Franco Udella, to defend the title against Lovera. Udella refused and was stripped of the championship. Lovera then faced 28 wins, 7 losses and 2 draws (ties) with 20 knockouts veteran Luis Estaba for the vacant championship in Caracas, Venezuela, September 13, 1975. Apparently, WBC officials were unaware that Lovera had no professional boxing fighting experience. This was revealed to them after the bout took place.
Estaba won the world title when he stopped the debuting contender in the fourth round. Lovera retired immediately afterwards, and he never returned to the professional boxing rings.

He stands as one of the few boxers from Paraguay ever to challenge for a major professional boxing world title, as well as one of the very few to do so in his first professional fight and to have challenged for a major world championship without ever actually winning a contest. His record was 0 wins and 1 loss in only 1 professional boxing bout.

See also
Pete Rademacher-who challenged for the world heavyweight title in his first professional match
Joves De La Puz
Joko Arter

References

External links
 

1952 births
Light-flyweight boxers
Living people
Paraguayan male boxers